The Port of Bandon is the port authority for Bandon Harbor in the city of Bandon, Oregon, United States. The port has full marina facilities for boat launching and sport fishing. It also serves as a waypoint stopover for commercial fishing and recreation vessels, and has a scenic boardwalk with a nature pathway and observation areas.
The United States Coast Guard operates Search and Rescue Detachment Coquille River in Bandon Harbor in the summer and on halibut season weekend openers in the spring, and is equipped with a 47-foot motor life boat and crew.

See also
Coquille River

References

External links
 Port of Bandon (official website)

Bandon, Port of
Bandon, Port of
Oregon Coast
Transportation in Coos County, Oregon